

Acts of the Northern Ireland Assembly

|-
| {{|Human Trafficking and Exploitation (Criminal Justice and Support for Victims) Act (Northern Ireland) 2015|ania|2|13-01-2015|maintained=y|archived=n|An Act to make provision about human trafficking, slavery and other forms of exploitation, including measures to prevent and combat such exploitation and to provide support for victims of such exploitation; and for connected purposes.}}
|-
| {{|Off-street Parking (Functions of District Councils) Act (Northern Ireland) 2015|ania|3|12-03-2015|maintained=y|archived=n|An Act to transfer to district councils certain functions in relation to off-street parking places; and for connected purposes.}}
|-
| {{|Budget Act (Northern Ireland) 2015|ania|4|12-03-2015|maintained=y|archived=n|An Act to authorise the issue out of the Consolidated Fund of certain sums for the service of the years ending 31st March 2015 and 2016; to appropriate those sums for specified purposes; to authorise the Department of Finance and Personnel to borrow on the credit of the appropriated sums; to authorise the use for the public service of certain resources for the years ending 31st March 2015 and 2016; and to revise the limits on the use of certain accruing resources in the year ending 31st March 2015.}}
|-
| {{|Pensions Act (Northern Ireland) 2015|ania|5|23-06-2015|maintained=y|archived=n|An Act to make provision about pensions and about benefits payable to people in connection with bereavement; and for connected purposes.}}
|-
| {{|Ombudsman and Commissioner for Complaints (Amendment) Act (Northern Ireland) 2015|ania|6|20-07-2015|maintained=y|archived=n|An Act to extend the maximum period for which an acting Assembly Ombudsman for Northern Ireland and an acting Northern Ireland Commissioner for Complaints may hold office.}}
|-
| {{|Budget (No. 2) Act (Northern Ireland) 2015|ania|7|24-07-2015|maintained=y|archived=n|An Act to authorise the issue out of the Consolidated Fund of certain sums for the service of the year ending 31st March 2016; to appropriate those sums for specified purposes; to authorise the Department of Finance and Personnel to borrow on the credit of the appropriated sums; to authorise the use for the public service of certain resources (including accruing resources) for the year ending 31st March 2016; and to repeal certain spent provisions.}}
|-
| {{|Reservoirs Act (Northern Ireland) 2015|ania|8|24-07-2015|maintained=y|archived=n|An Act to Make provision about the regulation of the management, construction and alteration of certain reservoirs, in particular in relation to their safety to collect and store water; and for connected purposes.}}
|-
| {{|Justice Act (Northern Ireland) 2015|ania|9|24-07-2015|maintained=y|archived=n|An Act to provide for a single jurisdiction for county courts and magistrates' courts; to amend the law on committal for trial; to provide for prosecutorial fines; to make provision in relation to victims and witnesses in criminal proceedings and investigations; to amend the law on criminal records and live links; to provide for violent offences prevention orders; to make other amendments relating to the administration of civil and criminal justice; and for connected purposes.}}
|-
| {{|Children's Services Co-operation Act (Northern Ireland) 2015|ania|10|09-12-2015|maintained=y|archived=n|An Act to require co-operation among certain public authorities and other persons in order to contribute to the well-being of children and young persons; to require the adoption of a children and young persons strategy; and for connected purposes.}}
}}

References

2015